The , or , is a partially completed tolled expressway in Japan. It is owned and operated by the Central Nippon Expressway Company. Upon completion, the expressway will form a second ring road around Nagoya in conjunction with the Isewangan Expressway. It is signed as C2 under the "2016 Proposal for Realization of Expressway Numbering."

Route description
The Mei-Nikan runs concurrent to Japan National Route 302, the only exception to this concurrency is the branch route that connects the ring road to the Tōmei Expressway.

The section between Hikiyama Interchange and Ōmori Interchange consists of tunnels that run underneath waterways; vehicles carrying dangerous goods are forbidden from travelling through these tunnels and must use alternate routes.

History
The first section of what would become the Mei-Nikan Expressway was opened on 23 March 1988 between Kiyosu-higashi Interchange and Nagoya-nishi Interchange as part of the Higashi-Meihan Expressway. The expressway was opened in phases since then as part of the Higashi-Meihan until 2011, when it was redesignated as the Mei-Nikan Expressway.

Future
Upon completion, this would complete the loop made around the city by the two expressways.

List of interchanges and features

 IC - interchange, SIC - smart interchange, JCT - junction, PA - parking area, SA - service area, TB - toll gate, TN - tunnel
The expressway is located entirely in Aichi Prefecture

Nagoya Connecting Road 
Located in Meito-ku, Nagoya

References

External links

Central Nippon Expressway Company

Expressways in Japan
Proposed roads in Japan
Transport in Nagoya
Roads in Aichi Prefecture